The Tataka Visitor Center is a visitor center in Yushan National Park located in Xinyi Township, Nantou County, Taiwan.

Architecture
At its upper floor, the visitor center consists of an exhibition hall about geology, wildlife, plants and culture. The building is located at an altitude of 2,600 meters above sea level.

Transportation
The visitor center is located along the Provincial Highway 21.

See also
 List of tourist attractions in Taiwan

References

Visitor centers in Nantou County